Berne is a rapid transit station located in the Hamburg quarter of Farmsen-Berne, Germany. The station was opened in 1918 and is served by Hamburg U-Bahn line U1.

History
The station was constructed from 1912 to 1914 and opened on 12 September 1918 on the Walddörfer railway line. The station was served by steam trains until 29 September 1919 and re-opened after electrification of one track on 6 September 1920. A second electrified track opened in 1923.

The station was located in a rural environment until the 1950s, when a local community center developed east of the station. Because the main entrance was at Berner Heerweg west of the station, the entranceway was re-built and a second entrance from the east was added, the two entrances linked by a bridge across the U-Bahn tracks. A restaurant can be found in the former station building today.

At the station, a third track without a platform is located. Originally built for goods transports of Altrahlstedt-Wohldorfer Kleinbahn (local railway), it was later re-built and  used for brake tests and other U-Bahn test driving starting from nearby Farmsen railway workshop.

Service

Trains  
Berne is served by Hamburg U-Bahn line U1; departures are every 10 minutes. The travel time to Hamburg Hauptbahnhof takes about 24 minutes.

See also 

 List of Hamburg U-Bahn stations

References

External links 

 Line and route network plans at hvv.de 

Hamburg U-Bahn stations in Hamburg
Buildings and structures in Wandsbek
U1 (Hamburg U-Bahn) stations
Transport infrastructure completed in 1914
Railway stations in Germany opened in 1918